In England, Sites of Special Scientific Interest (SSSIs) are designated by Natural England, which is responsible for protecting England's natural environment. Designation as an SSSI gives legal protection to the most important wildlife and geological sites.

Berkshire lies in the valleys of the Thames and its tributary, the River Kennet, and in the west it is crossed by chalk hills. It has a population of more than 860,000. It is no longer an administrative county following the abolition of Berkshire County Council in 1998. It is governed by six unitary authorities: Bracknell Forest, Reading, Slough, West Berkshire, Windsor and Maidenhead and Wokingham.

As of September 2019, there are 70 SSSIs in Berkshire, of which 8 are listed for their geological interest and 62 for their biological interest. Eight are Geological Conservation Review sites, three are Nature Conservation Review sites, two are Ramsar sites, five are Special Areas of Conservation, five are Special Protection Areas, five are Local nature reserves, one is listed on the Register of Historic Parks and Gardens and two contain Scheduled monuments. Fifteen sites are managed by Berkshire, Buckinghamshire and Oxfordshire Wildlife Trust, one by Surrey Wildlife Trust and three by the National Trust.

Interest
B = site of biological interest
G = site of geological interest

Public access
FP = access to footpaths through the site only
NO = no public access to site
PL = public access at limited times
PP = public access to part of site
YES = public access to all or most of the site

Other classifications
BBOWT = Berkshire, Buckinghamshire and Oxfordshire Wildlife Trust
GCR = Geological Conservation Review site
LNR = Local nature reserve
NCR = Nature Conservation Review site
NT = National Trust
Ramsar = Ramsar site, an internationally important wetland site
RHPG= Register of Historic Parks and Gardens
SAC = Special Area of Conservation
SM = Scheduled monument
SPA = Special Protection Area for birds
SWT = Surrey Wildlife Trust

Sites

See also

Berkshire, Buckinghamshire and Oxfordshire Wildlife Trust
List of local nature reserves in Berkshire

Notes

References

Sources

Sites of Special
 
Berkshire